Thunberginol F is a phthalide found in Hydrangea macrophylla.

References 

Catechols
Lactones
Phthalides
3-Hydroxypropenals